The Bashkir alphabet is a writing system used for the Bashkir language. Until the mid-19th century, Bashkir speakers wrote in the Türki literary language using the Arabic script. In 1869, Russian linguist Mirsalikh Bekchurin published the first guide to Bashkir grammar, and the first Cyrillic Bashkir introductory book was published by Vasily Katarinsky in Orenburg in 1892. Latinisation was first discussed in June 1924, when the first draft of the Bashkir alphabet using the Latin script was created. More reforms followed, culminating in the final version in 1938.

History

Early period 
Until the mid-19th century, Bashkir speakers wrote in the Türki literary language using the Arabic script. Many works of Bashkir literature were written in Türki, including Bashkir shezhere ("Genealogies of the Bashkir People"), Batyrsha's Letter to Empress Elizaveta, the orders of Salawat Yulayev, as well as works from the poets A. Kargaly, Tadgetdin Yalsigul Al-Bashkordi, H. Salikhov, Gali Sokoroy, Miftahetdin Akmulla, and Mukhametsalim Umetbaev. The influence of spoken Bashkir is noticeable in many works from the period.

The first attempts to create a writing system that fully represented the Bashkir language began in the middle of the 19th century, with writers attempting to adapt the Cyrillic alphabet. One such proponent was turkologist and linguist Nikolay Ilminsky, in his work Introductory Reading in the Turkish-Tatar Language Course.

In 1869, Russian linguist Mirsalikh Bekchurin published the first guide to Bashkir grammar in the book An Initial Guide to the Study of Arabic, Persian and Tatar Languages with the Adverbs of Bukhara, Bashkirs, Kyrgyz and Residents of Turkestan. The first Cyrillic Bashkir introductory book was published by Vasily Katarinsky in Orenburg in 1892, with his proposed alphabet excluding the letters ё, й, ѳ, and ѵ from the contemporaneous Cyrillic alphabet and including the additional characters of Ä, г̇, ҥ, Ö, ӳ. Another primer was prepared at the end of the 19th century by Nikolai Fyodorovich Katanov using the umlaut (ӓ – / ә /, ӧ – / ө /, ӟ – / ҙ /, к̈ – / ҡ /, ӱ – / и /, etc.), however this work was never published.

In 1907, Alexander Bessonov published The Primer for the Bashkirs. This publication proposed that alphabet included all the letters of the Cyrillic alphabet of the time, except for ё and й, and added the characters ä, г̣, д̣, ҥ, ö, с̣, and ӱ. Five years later, Mstislav Kulaev (Mukhametkhan Kulaev) published The Basics of Onomatopoeia and the Alphabet for Bashkirs (reprinted in 1919), again making use of the Cyrillic alphabet in conjunction with new characters.

Arabic alphabet 
In July 1921, the 2nd All-Bashkir Congress of Soviets decided to create their own script for Bashkir as the state language of the Bashkir ASSR. In December 1922, the Congress formed a commission for the development of a new official alphabet and spelling at the ASSR's Academic Center of the People's Commissariat of Education.

The commission adapted the Arabic alphabet to the needs of Bashkir phonology. The commission excluded some letters and normalized the spelling of vowels. The new writing system used a hamza (ﺀ) above vowels at the beginning of words. For those letters that represented both a consonant and a vowel, a stress sign (a vertical line) would be placed under the letter (ٸٖول – ул (he), ٸول – үл (die)).

In March 1924, minor changes were made concerning the representation of the sounds / s / and / e / at the beginning of a word. The Arabic-based alphabet remained in use until 1930.

 Latin alphabet 

 

The Bashkir ASSR Academic Center began discussing Latinisation in June 1924 and drafted a Bashkir alphabet using the Latin script later that year. That draft was later modified according to the following suggestions:

In June 1927, the All-Union Committee of the New Turkic Alphabet approved a single alphabet for the Turkic peoples of the USSR; Yañalif. The Bashkir Latinized alphabet was again revised to align with this standard, and on 6 July 1930, the Central Executive Committee of the Bashkir ASSR officially approved the new revision. In May 1933, at the conference of the Bashkir Scientific Research Institute of Language and Literature, the letter Ç ç was removed. The digraph ьj'' was similarly eliminated in 1938. Following these reforms, the Bashkir Latinized alphabet existed as follows:

Cyrillic alphabet

Historical and current alphabets 
Compiled by:

References

Cyrillic alphabets
Alphabets used by Turkic languages
Bashkir language